Wire fu is an element or style of Hong Kong action cinema used in fight scenes. It is a combination of two terms: "wire work" and "kung fu".

Wire fu is used to describe a subgenre of kung fu movies where the stuntmen's or actor's skill is augmented with the use of wires and pulleys, as well as other stage techniques, usually to perform fight-scene stunts and give the illusion of super-human ability (or qinggong). It is exemplified by the work of Tsui Hark, Yuen Woo-ping, and Jet Li. Hollywood has subsequently adapted the style for the American film industry. Almost all modern wuxia movies fall in this category. Not all martial arts films use wire work.

In practice
The basic concept is not very complex and originates in the mechanical effects of stagecraft. Planning and persistence are important, as it often requires many takes to perfect the stunt.

Typically, a harness is hidden under the actor's costume, and a cable and pulley system is attached to the harness. When live sets are used, wire removal is done in post-production. Another later-developed technique of creating wire fu is using a greenscreen and post-production special effects. Greenscreening the wire work is done for more complex stunts and camera angles. The actors are suspended in the air by green wires, which are then erased digitally during the post-production process. The process by which this was done in older (pre-digital) movies was to use film coloration techniques in a method similar to animation; artists (usually animators), would painstakingly go frame by frame over the raw footage and color in the wires to match the background.

Wire work is often used in kung fu movies to simply allow actors to perform stunts beyond their physical abilities. In films such as Crouching Tiger, Hidden Dragon, it is used to create a more dramatic effect and adds magical realism to the world in which the film takes place.

Examples of wire fu movies
 Sister Street Fighter (1974)
 Fong Sai-yuk (1993) (Fang Shi Yu), also known as The Legend of Fong Sai-yuk
 Iron Monkey (1993) (Siu Nin Wong Fei Hung Chi: Tit Ma Lau)
 The Matrix (1999)
 Charlie's Angels (2000)
 Crouching Tiger, Hidden Dragon (2000)
 X-Men (2000)
 Hero (2002)
 Austin Powers in Goldmember (2002)
 Kill Bill (2003)
 Charlie's Angels: Full Throttle (2003)
 House of Flying Daggers (2004) (Shi Mian Mai Fu)
 Mulan (2020)
 Shang-Chi and the Legend of the Ten Rings (2020)

See also
 Gun fu

References 

 
Theatrical combat
Action films by genre
Cinema of Hong Kong
Film genres